Phai Lom is a tambon (sub-district) of Laplae District, in Uttaradit Province, Thailand. In 2005 it had a population of 6,727. The tambon contains seven villages.

References

Tambon of Uttaradit province
Populated places in Uttaradit province